Nyangatom (also Inyangatom, Donyiro, Dongiro, Idongiro) is a Nilotic language spoken in Ethiopia by the Nyangatom people. It is an oral language only, having no working orthography at present. Related languages include Toposa and Turkana, both of which have a level of mutual intelligibility; Blench (2012) counts it as a dialect of Turkana.

Phonology

Consonants

Vowels

Vowel length is contrastive in Nyangatom, as in dʒík 'completely' vs. dʒíík 'always'
Before a pause, short vowels carrying a single, simple tone are devoiced.

Bibliography
Dimmendaal, Gerrit J. 2007. "Ñaŋatom language" in Siegbert Uhlig (ed.) Encyclopaedia Aethiopica, Vol 3. Wiesbaden: Harrassowitz. pp. 1131–1132.

References

Languages of Ethiopia
Eastern Nilotic languages